Jefimijs Klementjevs (sometimes listed as Efims Klementjevs, born 17 March 1963) is a Latvian sprint canoer who competed from the early 1990s to the early 2000s. Competing in two Summer Olympics, he earned his best finish of seventh in the C-1 1000 m event at Sydney in 2000. In 2013 he was elected to be 1 of the 60 Riga City Council seat members.

References

External links
 
 

1963 births
Living people
People from Jēkabpils Municipality
Social Democratic Party "Harmony" politicians
For Stability! politicians
Deputies of the 14th Saeima
Latvian male canoeists
Olympic canoeists of Latvia
Canoeists at the 1992 Summer Olympics
Canoeists at the 2000 Summer Olympics